Christian Action, Research and Education (CARE) is a social policy charity based in the United Kingdom, with offices in London, Scotland and Northern Ireland.

Founding and programmes
CARE began in 1971 as the Nationwide Festival of Light, but was renamed in 1983 to reflect a substantial shift in emphasis. Over the following decades it established the following departments, in the belief that Christians should show active care as well as campaigning for moral standards in society:

Care for the Family, a registered charity now independent of CARE, initially established in 1988 as the UK sister ministry of Focus on the Family
Care Confidential, which runs pregnancy counselling centres, and became independent in July 2011
Caring Services (defunct)
Care for Education (defunct)
Fostering, long term and remand care (defunct)
Evaluate, CARE's sex and relationships education programme

CARE also runs the "Leadership Programme", an internship programme securing placements for graduates. Some work as researchers for MPs, mostly in the Conservative party, and MSPs while others work in Christian NGOs. The funding of political research assistants by a "right-wing Christian" lobby group has attracted controversy, although CARE claims that there is a clear separation between the internships and its lobbying side. Unlike journalists, researchers have virtually unrestricted access to parliamentary documents and in 2008 Paul Burstow MP was questioned after failing to include a research assistant's CARE sponsorship on the main register -though he said he didn't believe they had behaved improperly.

In 2022, an investigation by openDemocracy revealed that 20 British MPs had taken staff members from CARE since 2012.

Charity registration
Christian Action Research and Education (CARE) Trust (registered charity number 288485, registered 12 January 1984) ceased to exist on 30 September 2008. CARE (Christian Action Research and Education) (registered charity number 1066963, registered 18 December 1997) is still operational.

Leadership
Lyndon Bowring is the Executive Chairman of the organization. He is a former minister at Kensington Temple, in London, and currently is on the staff of Regents Theological College.

Finance
CARE's annual income to March 2021 was over £2 million, mostly from voluntary donations. 
The cost of the intern programme is around £70,000 p.a. 
It is supported by 40,000 donors.

Impact
CARE has been described as "an evangelical charity that promotes traditional family values"; the organisation has actively campaigned against LGBT rights, abortion, stem cell research and assisted dying bills. Its work has been dismissed in the House of Lords as "propaganda".

Opposition to homosexuality, abortion and prostitution
Labour Party insiders credited CARE with significant influence in support of Section 28 regarding education and homosexuality. CARE has received media criticism for its stance on abortion and homosexuality and was accused in 2000 by MP Ben Bradshaw of being "a bunch of homophobic bigots". CARE has also been criticised for their opposition to abortion and gay rights.

In 2009, CARE had a stall at an event run by Anglican Mainstream called 'Sex in the City'. The event claimed to be "about the plethora of sexual issues confronting us in today's society, including mentoring the sexually broken, the sexualisation of culture, pornography, the Bible and sex, and marriage, the family and sex", but made headlines after National Association for Research and Therapy of Homosexuality (NARTH) founder Joseph Nicolosi was invited to speak, alongside Arthur Goldberg, co-founder of Jews Offering New Alternatives to Homosexuality. CARE have subsequently stated that they oppose abusive conversion therapy practices, while wanting to make sure that prospective laws do not impede religious liberty.

CARE have funded the network of CareConfidential crisis pregnancy centres in the UK, some of which came under criticism in an investigation by The Daily Telegraph when counsellors were filmed undercover claiming abortions would increase chances of breast cancer and could predispose women to becoming child sexual abusers.

CARE are listed in the UK Parliament's register of all-party groups as the secretariat of the All-party parliamentary group (APPG) on Prostitution and the Global Sex Trade, a pressure group to encourage 'government action to tackle individuals who create demand for sexual services'.

In 2015, CARE backed a private member's bill to prohibit the advertising of prostitution, the Advertising of Prostitution (Prohibition) Bill 2015-16, which was introduced by Lord McColl of Dulwich in the House of Lords.

Other campaigns
CARE's 2010 report on taxation claimed that the tax burden had moved from single people with no dependants into families with two adults but only a single earner in them.

References

External links

Anti-abortion organisations in the United Kingdom
Christian organisations based in the United Kingdom
Christian political organizations
Evangelical parachurch organizations
Lobbying organisations in the United Kingdom
Organisations based in the City of Westminster
Organizations established in 1971
Organizations that oppose LGBT rights
Religion in the City of Westminster
1971 establishments in the United Kingdom
Organisations that oppose LGBT rights in the United Kingdom